Godfather most often refers to a male godparent in the Christian tradition.

Godfather, God Father, or variants may also refer to:

Crime
 A synonym for crime boss
 Capo dei capi, Italian for "boss of all bosses"

People
 The Godfather (wrestler) (born 1961), ring name of professional wrestler Charles Wright
 Godfather Don, American rapper and record producer
 Pat Riley, former professional basketball coach and current president of the Miami Heat

Film
 The Godfather, a 1972 film starring Marlon Brando
 The Godfather (film series)
 The Godfather (soundtrack)
 Godfather (1991 film), an Indian Malayalam-language film by Siddique–Lal
 Godfather (2007 film), a Pakistani film by Hariday Shetty
 Godfather (2012 film), an Indian Kannada-language film by P. C. Sriram
 Godfather (soundtrack)
 God Father (2017 film), an Indian Odia-language film
 God Father (2020 film), an Indian Tamil-language film
 GodFather (2022 film), an Indian Telugu-language film

Literature
 The Godfather (book series)
 "The Godfather" (fairy tale), a story from Grimms' Fairy Tales
 The Godfather (novel), a 1969 novel by Mario Puzo

Music
 The Godfathers (rap duo), a hip hop duo consisting of Kool G Rap and Necro, from Brooklyn
 The Godfathers, an alternative rock band from London, England
 Godfather (album), album by Wiley 2017
 The Godfather, a compilation album by Héctor el Father
 For musicians called "Godfather of ...", see Honorific nicknames in popular music
 Godfather of Punk (disambiguation)

Television
 The Godfathers (TV series), a 1970 Australian television show
 "The Godfather", an episode of Married... with Children

Video games
 The Godfather (1991 video game), a DOS game based on the film trilogy
 The Godfather (2006 video game), based on Puzo's novel and the film trilogy

Other uses
 Godfather (cocktail)
 Godfather's Pizza, a United States restaurant chain

See also

God (disambiguation)
God the Father
Goodfather (disambiguation)
The Three Godfathers (disambiguation)
Father (disambiguation)
El Padrino (disambiguation), Spanish for "the Godfather"; also including Italian 'Il Padrino'
Parrain (disambiguation), French for "Godfather"